James Winchester (February 26, 1752 – July 26, 1826) was an officer in the Continental Army in the American Revolutionary War (1775–1783) and a brigadier general during the War of 1812 (1812–1815). He commanded the American forces at the Battle of Frenchtown, which led to the Massacre of the River Raisin.

Early life
Son of William Winchester and Lydia Richards, he was born February 26, 1752, in Carroll County, Maryland. Winchester enlisted in the Maryland militia during the American Revolution. He served in Gen. Hugh Mercer's Flying Camp battalion during the early months of the war. He was captured by British forces during Gen. John Sullivan's failed attempt to take Staten Island on August 22, 1777. Winchester was released in a prisoner exchange, and in May 1778 he was commissioned a lieutenant in the 3rd Maryland Regiment. He was taken prisoner a second time at the surrender of Charlestown, South Carolina on May 12, 1780. Exchanged in December, he was promoted to captain and served the remainder of the war under Gen. Nathanael Greene. At the conclusion of his service in November 1783, he was admitted as an original member of The Society of the Cincinnati in the state of Maryland.

Life in Tennessee
In 1785, Winchester moved to what is now central Tennessee, then a frontier district of North Carolina. He became an officer in the militia and eventually was promoted to brigadier general. Following Tennessee's admission to the union in 1796, Winchester was elected to its first Tennessee General Assembly serving in the Tennessee State Senate. In 1802, he completed the construction of his plantation home, Cragfont. Winchester was considered as a nominee for the United States Senate in the 1809 United States Senate election in Tennessee, but Jenkin Whiteside was elected to the seat. Winchester was also an unsuccessful candidate in the 1811 United States House of Representatives elections in Tennessee.

War of 1812
In March 1812, three months before the war with Britain began, Winchester was commissioned a brigadier general in the United States Army. When the hostilities started, he was placed in command of the Army of the Northwest, composed of several regiments then camped near Cincinnati. However, a conflict over command resulted in Gen. William Henry Harrison taking charge of Winchester's forces in an expedition against Fort Wayne, by virtue of Harrison's militia commission from Kentucky. Winchester's seniority was confirmed in September, but he was forced to relinquish command several days later when Harrison was commissioned a major general in the regular army.

Later that month, Winchester commanded one wing of Harrison's advance to Fort Defiance. After engaging in several skirmishes with British and Native American forces, he camped at the Maumee Rapids (present day Toledo, Ohio) in December 1812.

River Raisin Massacre
Early in 1813, Winchester took part in an attempt to recapture Frenchtown (present day Monroe, Michigan). On January 18, his men drove off a smaller Canadian and Indian force and recaptured the American town. However, his men were attacked four days later by a combined British/Indian/Canadian force under Col. Henry Procter in the Battle of Frenchtown. Winchester himself was captured by Roundhead while trying to reach his men. Following the loss of hundreds of his soldiers in the initial assault, he agreed to order a conditional surrender of the remainder of his troops in exchange for "a pledge of protection". Despite Procter's pledge, Indians accompanying the British slaughtered 68 seriously wounded American soldiers in the Massacre of the River Raisin.

Winchester was imprisoned in Canada for more than a year. He was released in a prisoner exchange and assigned to command the District of Mobile. After the war's end, he resigned his regular commission in March 1815 and returned home to Tennessee.

Post war years
In 1819, Winchester served on the state commission to regulate the Tennessee-Missouri boundary. Along with Andrew Jackson and John Overton, he founded the city of Memphis, Tennessee on May 22, 1819.

Death and legacy

Winchester died in Gallatin, Tennessee at the age of 74 on July 26, 1826. He is buried in Winchester Cemetery at Gallatin.

The city of Winchester, Tennessee, is named in his honor.

See also
William Atherton (soldier)

References
McHenry, Robert. Webster's American Military Biographies, Springfield, Mass.: G & C. Merriam Co., 1978.

External links
 The Society of the Cincinnati
 The American Revolution Institute

War of 1812 - People & Stories: James Winchester
Tennessee Documentary History, 1796-1850: General Orders, 1812 July 8, Nashville (to) Captain John Ballinger, New Orleans/General J. Winchester
Digitized images of James Winchester logbook, 1812, housed at the University of Kentucky Libraries Special Collections Research Center

1752 births
1826 deaths
American Revolutionary War prisoners of war held by Great Britain
Tennessee state senators
United States Army generals
Continental Army officers from Maryland
United States Army personnel of the War of 1812
People from Carroll County, Maryland
People from Castalian Springs, Tennessee
People from Tennessee in the War of 1812
War of 1812 prisoners of war held by the United Kingdom